Blood and Henna is a 2012 Nigerian film directed by Kenneth Gyang, starring Ali Nuhu, Sadiq Sani Sadiq and Nafisat Abdullahi. The film tries to narrate the ordeal of the 1996 Pfizer Clinical Test in Kano, Nigeria. It received 6 nominations at the 9th Africa Movie Academy Awards, and eventually won only the award for Best Costume Design.

Plot
Set in a 1996 Nigeria, a Lagos shop-owner, Musa returns to his hometown in Northern Nigeria after his shop was set ablaze in Lagos due to political unrests in the state by opposing parties. Musa is warmly welcomed in his village by everyone especially from two of his very close friends. One of his friends, Shehu, a journalist very critical of the present military government had to quit his job to teach in a community school. Saude's father is the wealthiest farmer in the village. He married off Sude to Musa after He expanded his father's business with his expertise in farming. The couple were having a perfect marriage until she began to have series of miscarriages. A deadly infection is spread across the village which threatens the very existence of the community.

Cast
Sadiq Sani Sadiq
Nafisat Abdullahi
Ali Nuhu
Ibrahim Daddy
Beauty Sankey
Salihu Bappa
Yachat Sankey

Release
A trailer for the film was released on November 25, 2011.

Accolades

References

Nigerian drama films
Films about infectious diseases
Hausa-language culture
Best Costume Design Africa Movie Academy Award winners